Ghost Hunters Academy is a paranormal reality  television series that premiered on November 11, 2009, on the Syfy channel. The program was the third spin-off series based on Ghost Hunters (after Ghost Hunters International and UFO Hunters). The show featured TAPS members Steve Gonsalves and Dave Tango as they led a group of prospective investigators on various ghost hunting cases at locations that are allegedly haunted, and which had been previously investigated by TAPS.

Premise
The series featured Dave Tango and Steve Gonsalves teaching a group of aspiring ghost hunters how to explore some of the most haunted locations in the country with the TAPS methodology from the Ghost Hunters series. Recruits were taken to some of the most "active" areas investigated on the main show at the time, such as Waverly Hills Sanatorium and St. Augustine Lighthouse. Participants who "passed" the course were able to elect to move to Ghost Hunters or Ghost Hunters International.

Cast

Lead investigators
 Steve Gonsalves
 Dave Tango
 Jason Hawes (arbitrated eliminations during Season 1.5)
 Grant Wilson (arbitrated eliminations during Season 1.5)

Investigators-in-training
Dismissed
 Heathyr Hoffman (ep. 1–3)
 Chris McCune (ep. 1–5)
 Jane Riley (ep. 3–6)
 Ben Smith* (ep. 1–6)
 Chris Smith* (ep. 5–6)
 Eric Baldino (ep. 7–12)
 Rosalyn Bown (ep. 7–10)
 Daniel Hwang (ep. 7–8)
 Vera Martinez (ep. 7–11)
 Brett McGinnis (ep. 7–9)
 Natalie Poole (ep. 7)
 Michelle Tate (ep. 7–12, moved to Ghost Hunters for Season 9)
Graduated
 Karl Pfeiffer (ep. 1–6, moved on to GHI)
 Susan Slaughter (ep. 1–6, moved on to GHI)
 Adam Berry (ep. 7–12, moved on to Ghost Hunters)

*Allowed to continue training in Season 1.5, but did not return.

Episodes

References

External links
 
 

2009 American television series debuts
2000s American reality television series
2010s American reality television series
2010 American television series endings
Ghost Hunters (TV series)
American television spin-offs
English-language television shows
Paranormal reality television series
Syfy original programming
Reality television spin-offs